Faraday is an unincorporated community in McDowell County, West Virginia, United States. It lies just north of the border with Tazewell County, Virginia on County Route 9.

References

Unincorporated communities in McDowell County, West Virginia
Unincorporated communities in West Virginia

vo:Faraday